High Low may refer to:

High-low split, a poker variation
High-Low (game show), a 1957 American game show
High–low pricing, a type of pricing strategy
High/Low (album), a 1996 album by Nada Surf
High–low system, a design for artillery shells and grenade-launcher ammunition
High Low, an album by Nathan Wiley
"High Low", a song by The Unlikely Candidates
High Low, a hill in the English parish of Highlow

See also 
Hi-Lo (disambiguation)